The Navanath (हिंदी - नवनाथ), also spelt as Navnatha  in vernacular languages, are the nine saints, Masters or Naths on whom the Navnath Sampradaya, the lineage of the nine gurus, is based. They are worshipped collectively as well as individually.

Nine gurus

Some members of the Nath Sampraday believe Rishi Dattatreya, an incarnation of the Hindu trinity Brahma, Vishnu and Shiva was its first teacher. Other traditions hold that Matsyendranath received initiation directly from Shiva, also known as Adi Nath. In many modern Nath groups, worship of Gorakshanath and Shiva is primary. The nine teachers, collectively known as Navnaths, are considered representative of great teachers in this tradition or parampara.

Several lists are known:

Nisargadatta Maharaj 
According to Maurice Frydman, the translator of Nisargadatta Maharaj's I Am That, "the most widely accepted list" and Suamitra Mullarpattan is as follows:
 Machindranath or Matsyendranath,(9th Century), "who was said to be, initiated by one of the three primary Hindu gods (Vishnu, Shiva, Brahma), namely by Shiva, in the science and teaching of Yoga."
 Gorakshanath or Gorakhnath
 Jalindranath or Jalindranath
 Kanifnath or Kanhoba
 Gahininath or Gehininath
 Bhartrinath or Bhartarinath or Raja Bhartari or Bhartṛhari
 Revananath or Revan Siddh or Kada Siddha or Ravalanath
 Charpatinath or Charpatakshnath
 Naganath or Nageshnath

List 2
Matsyendranath (the chief Natha), Gorakshanatha, Charpatinatha, Mangalnatha, Ghugonatha, Gopinatha, Prannatha, Suratnatha and Cambanatha. They are not related to the divisions of the orders.

List 3
In another list each Natha is identified with a Hindu god:1. Aumkar Adinatha (Lord of Lords), Siva; 2. Shelnatha (Lord of the Arrow Shaft), Krisna or Rama Chandra; 3. Santoknatha (Lord of Gratification) 4. Acalacambhunatha (Lord of Wondrous Immortality), Hanuman or Laksman; 5. Gajbali Gajkanthnatha (Lord of the Elephant's Strength and Neck)) Ganesa Gajikarna (Elephant-Eared); 6. Prajnatha, or Udaynatha (Lord of the People), Parvati; 7. Mayarupi Macchendranatha (The Wondrous Form), Guru of Gorakhnatha; 8. Gathepinde Ricayakari, or Naranthar, Sambhujaiti Guru Gorakhnatha; 9. Gyansarupe, or Purakh Siddh Cauranjwenatha, or Puran Bhagat.

List 4
Orhkarinath, Visnu; Samtokanath, Visnu; Gajboli, Gajana, Hanuman; Acalesvar, Ganpati; Udayanatha, Surya; Parvati Prem, Mahadeo; Santhanatha, Brahma; Gyaniji Siddhacewarafigi, Jaggannath; Mayarupi, Matsya. The Nathas are also the guardian spirits of the Himalayan peaks.

List 5
1.Adinath 2. Udaynath Parvati 3.Satyanath Brahamaji 4.Santoshnath Vishnuji 5.Achabhenath Shesh 6.Kanthadnath Ganeshji 7.Chaurangi Chandrma 8.Matsyendranath 9.Gorakhnathh.

List 6
Omkarnath, Udaynath, Santoshnath, Achalnath, Gajbalinath, Gyannath, Chauranginath, Matsyendranath, Gorakhnath.

List 7
Macchendranatha, Gorakhnath, Jalandhernath, Kanifnath, Charpatinath, Naagnath, Bhartrharinath, Gahininath, Ravennath.

List 8
Shri Gorakhnath, Javaalendranath, Kaarinanath, Gahini nath, Charpath nath, Revan nath, Naag nath, Bharthari Nath, Gopichand Nath.

The nine Naths are the incarnations of nine Narayanas who help Lord Narayan in taking care of the worldly activities. Lord Krishna had summoned the nine Narayans to his court for deciding the establishment of Nath Sampraday.

Notes

References

 
 
 .

Further reading
 .

Lists of Hindu religious leaders
Shaivism
Inchegeri Sampradaya
Navnath